The 1914 West Virginia Mountaineers football team was an American football team that represented West Virginia University as an independent during the 1914 college football season. In its first season under head coach Sol Metzger, the team compiled a 5–4 record and outscored opponents by a total of 159 to 96. Orrin H. Davis was the team captain.

Schedule

References

West Virginia
West Virginia Mountaineers football seasons
West Virginia Mountaineers football